The Visitor is a 2007 British short film directed by Dave Smith and starring Ciarán Griffiths and Conrad Westmaas.

See also
 The Visitor (2007 drama film) - an award-winning feature film written and directed by Thomas McCarthy

References

2007 films
British short films
2000s English-language films